Sebastian Haupt (born 17 December 1985 in Heilbad Heiligenstadt, Thuringia) is a German skeleton racer who has competed since 2001. He won the gold medal in the mixed bobsleigh-skeleton team event at the 2008 FIBT World Championships in Altenberg, Germany.

Haupt also finished ninth in the men's skeleton event at the 2006 Winter Olympics in Turin.

References
2006 men's skeleton results
FIBT profile
Skeletonsport.com profile

1985 births
Living people
People from Heilbad Heiligenstadt
German male skeleton racers
Skeleton racers at the 2006 Winter Olympics
Olympic skeleton racers of Germany
Sportspeople from Thuringia
20th-century German people
21st-century German people